Letta Mbulu (born 23 August 1942) is a South African jazz singer who has been active since the 1960s.

Biography
Born and raised in Soweto, South Africa, she has been active as a singer since the 1960s. While still a teenager she toured with the musical King Kong — but left for the United States in 1964 due to Apartheid.

In New York City, she connected with other South African exiles, including Miriam Makeba, Hugh Masekela and Jonas Gwangwa, and went on to work with Cannonball Adderley, David Axelrod and Harry Belafonte.

On screen, her singing can also be heard in Roots, The Color Purple (1985), and the 1973 film A Warm December, and she was a guest on a Season 6 episode of Soul Train. Mbulu also provided the Swahili chant in Michael Jackson's single, "Liberian Girl". Producer Quincy Jones has said of her: "Mbulu is the roots lady, projecting a sophistication and warmth which stirs hope for attaining pure love, beauty, and unity in the world."

She is the founding member of the South African Artists United (SAAU) an organisation that was established in 1986.

Personal life
Mbulu is married to musician Caiphus Semenya. As the apartheid regime loomed over people of colour in the 1970s, Mbulu went to the United States, where, in exile, she continued to pursue music. She toured with jazz alto saxophonist Cannonball Adderley, and also went on to join forces with American singer Harry Belafonte. Together they went on several world tours. Her main musical influences became folk, American Jazz and Brazilian music.

Awards
 2001: South African Music Award or lifetime achievement.
 2009: Order of Ikhamanga in Silver erhielt.
 2018: lifetime achievement award.

Discography
 Letta Mbulu Sings (Capitol, 1967)
 Free Soul (Capitol, 1968)
 Letta (Chisa, 1970)
 Naturally (Fantasy, 1972)
 There's Music in the Air (A&M, 1976)
 Letta (A&M, 1977)
 Letta Mbulu – Gold (A&M, 1978)
 Letta Mbulu – Sweet juju (Morning, 1985)
 The Best of Letta & Caiphus (Columbia, 1996)
 Greatest Hits (Columbia, 1999)
 Letta Mbulu Sings/Free Soul (Stateside, 2005)
 Culani Nami (Sony, 2007)

With Quincy Jones
 Roots (A&M, 1977)

References

External links 
Article discussing Mbulu

1942 births
Living people
People from Soweto
20th-century South African women singers
South African jazz singers
21st-century South African women singers